Elnhausen is a borough (Ortsbezirk) of Marburg in Hesse.

First documents date back to 1234. Back then the village was probably called Ellenhusen.

The village is divided into the old part with the castle, the church, farms and a newer part with several development areas.

References

External links 
 https://www.marburg.de/elnhausen

Districts of Marburg